"The American Dream" is a song written and recorded by American country music artist Hank Williams Jr.  It was released in September 1982 as the first single from his compilation album Hank Williams Jr.'s Greatest Hits.  The song reached number 5 on the Billboard Hot Country Singles & Tracks chart.

Chart performance

References

1982 singles
1982 songs
Hank Williams Jr. songs
Songs written by Hank Williams Jr.
Song recordings produced by Jimmy Bowen
Elektra Records singles
Curb Records singles